David Henry Humm (April 2, 1952 – March 27, 2018) was an American professional football player who played as a quarterback in the NFL from 1975–84 for the Oakland / Los Angeles Raiders, the Buffalo Bills, and the Baltimore Colts. He played college football at the University of Nebraska.

Early years
Born and raised in Las Vegas, Nevada, Humm attended Bishop Gorman High School, where he was an All-American prep quarterback and a heavily recruited prospect. Humm was subsequently inducted into the Southern Nevada Sports Hall of Fame in 1997.

Humm accepted a scholarship from the University of Nebraska, where he was a three-year starter from 1972–74 under head coaches Bob Devaney and Tom Osborne. Humm succeeded Jerry Tagge, who piloted Nebraska to back-to-back national championships in 1970 and 1971.

Although he could not win as a starter against rival Oklahoma, Humm led the Huskers to three postseason victories in the Orange, Cotton, and Sugar Bowls.

Professional career
Humm was selected by the Oakland Raiders in the fifth round of the 1975 NFL Draft with the 128th overall pick, partly because he was ambidextrous. The next year, he was a part of the Super Bowl XI championship team. He was the backup to Ken Stabler for five seasons and was also an effective holder for field goals or extra points. Humm had an unusual habit of going on to the field with no shoulder pads, which sometimes tipped the opposing team that a fake field goal was unlikely.

In 1981, Humm signed as a free agent with the Baltimore Colts. That year, the game between the Colts and the Dallas Cowboys was the only start in his NFL career when injuries sidelined Bert Jones and Greg Landry. He completed seven of 24 passes for 90 yards and two interceptions, in a 37-13 loss, the thirteenth consecutive for the Colts. Notably, the opposing quarterback for the Cowboys, Glenn Carano, was also making his first and only NFL start in place of Danny White. This is the only time in league history two "one and done" quarterbacks have ever faced off. Carano and Humm were the subjects of an NFL Films piece entitled My One and Only, recounting the 1981 game. The two quarterbacks had been friends since high school (both played high school football in Nevada), and remained friends until Humm's death.

In 1983, he was signed as a free agent by the Los Angeles Raiders. That season, he was a part of the Super Bowl XVIII championship team, serving as the third-string quarterback behind Jim Plunkett and Marc Wilson.

Humm was the only Raiders player to be a member of both the Raiders' 1976 Super Bowl XI and 1983 Super Bowl XVIII championship teams, without also being a member of the 1980 Super Bowl XV championship team.

Humm's last NFL action came in a Week 10 contest in 1984 against the Chicago Bears, a game considered one of the most violent in NFL history.

Personal life
After his playing career, Humm served as an analyst for Mutual Broadcasting System, the Las Vegas Posse, and the Oakland Raiders.

In 1988, Humm was diagnosed with multiple sclerosis at age 36 and lost the use of his legs in 1997. He had set up a broadcasting studio in his home and worked as a color commentator for the Oakland Raiders. Humm died due to complications from multiple sclerosis on March 27, 2018.

References

External links
 Nebraska Cornhuskers bio

1952 births
2018 deaths
American football quarterbacks
Baltimore Colts players
Buffalo Bills players
Canadian Football League announcers
Los Angeles Raiders players
National Football League announcers
Nebraska Cornhuskers football players
Oakland Raiders announcers
Oakland Raiders players
Players of American football from Nevada
Sportspeople from Las Vegas
Neurological disease deaths in Nevada
Bishop Gorman High School alumni
Deaths from multiple sclerosis